The fifth season of The Real Housewives of New Jersey, an American reality television series, was broadcast on Bravo. It aired from June 2, 2013, until October 20, 2013, and was primarily filmed in Franklin Lakes, New Jersey. Its executive producers are Rebecca Toth Diefenbach, Valerie Haselton, Lucilla D'Agostino, Jim Fraenkel, Omid Kahangi, Caroline Self, Tess Gamboa Meyers and Andy Cohen.

The Real Housewives of New Jersey focuses on the lives of Teresa Giudice, Jacqueline Laurita, Caroline Manzo, Melissa Gorga and Kathy Wakile. It consisted of twenty-two episodes.

Production and crew
The Real Housewives of New Jersey was officially renewed for a fifth season on April 2, 2013. 

The season premiere "Garden State of Emergency" was aired on June 2, 2013, while the twentieth episode "Salon, Farewell" served as the season finale, and was aired on September 29, 2013. It was followed by a two-part reunion that aired on October 6, and October 13, 2013. A two-part episode "The Real Housewives Tell All"  marked the conclusion of the season and was broadcast on October 14, and October 20, 2013.

Rebecca Toth Diefenbach, Valerie Haselton, Lucilla D'Agostino, Jim Fraenkel, Omid Kahangi, Caroline Self, Tess Gamboa Meyers and Andy Cohen are recognized as the series' executive producers; it is produced and distributed by Sirens Media.

Cast and synopsis
The fifth season saw no regular cast changes made at the beginning of the series and all the wives returning. Kim DePaola returned in a recurring capacity.

The season continued with the family drama between Teresa Giudice and her family and fellow cast member Melissa Gorga and Kathy Wakile. Instead of fighting, majority of the cast aimed to mending their fractured relationships and leaving the drama behind. Throughout the seasons the wives' loyalty is put to the test as rumors circle around New Jersey and they question who is the catalyst of the gossip. By the end of the season many of the ladies have made tough decisions on whether to move forward with their friendships or leave them behind.

Episodes

References

External links

2013 American television seasons
New Jersey (season 5)